Naseri (also Romanized as Nāserī) is a village in Naseri Rural District, Khanafereh District, Shadegan County, Khuzestan Province, Iran. At the 2006 census, its population was 1,426, in 226 families.

References 

Populated places in Shadegan County